Sathyam Sivam Sundaram is a 2000 Indian Malayalam-language comedy drama film written and directed by Rafi Mecartin and produced by Siyad Kokker through Kokers Films. It stars Kunchacko Boban, Aswathi Menon, and Jagadish, with Harisree Ashokan, Cochin Haneefa, and Balachandra Menon in supporting roles. The movie marked the debut of cinematographer Ravivarman.

Cast
 
Kunchacko Boban as Chandrahassan aka Chandru
Aswathi Menon as Vijayalakshmi aka Viji
Jagadish as Pankajakshan
Balachandra Menon as K.S.K. Nambiar
Jagathy Sreekumar  as Shivaraman
Cochin Haneefa as Ajayan
Harishree Ashokan as Vijayan 
Ambika  as Nandhini
Nassar as Indra Raja Reddy
Janardanan as Sambhavana Warrier
Indrans as Sashankan
T. P. Madhavan as Hotelier 
Mansoor Ali Khan as Andhra Ponnan
Shilpa Punnoose as Chandrahasan's sister

Soundtrack 
The music was composed by Vidyasagar with lyrics by Kaithapram Damodaran, except for the song "Sathyam Shivam Sundaram" from the 1978 Hindi film Satyam Shivam Sundaram composed by Laxmikant–Pyarelal and written by Pandit Narendra Sharma, which was reused in the film. The soundtrack was distributed by Sagarika music. The song "Walking in the Moonlight" was later remade by Vidyasagar in Telugu for Love Today (2004) and in Tamil as "Kannal pesum" for Mozhi (2007).

References

External links

2000 films
2000s Malayalam-language films
Films scored by Vidyasagar
Films directed by Rafi–Mecartin